This is a list of Scottish football transfers for the 2009–10 season.

Only moves featuring at least one 2009–10 Scottish Premier League club or one 2009–10 Scottish First Division club are listed.

May 2009 – December 2009

January 2010 – May 2010

References

Transfers
Scottish
2009
Scotland